Parents :father Patrick Murphy from kilmichael, Co. Cork, Ireland. 
Catherine McKevitt Murphy (born 7 August 1967) is a British actress. She is known for her television roles as Tilly Watkins in the BBC drama The House of Eliott (1991–1994), Cheryl Barker in the Channel 5 soap opera Family Affairs (2003–2004), and as Julie Perkins in the BBC soap opera EastEnders (2010–2011).

Career
Born in Essex, England. Murphy studied at the Sylvia Young Theatre School. She played the role of Lorna in 1991, a love interest of Mark Fowler in soap opera EastEnders. In 2005 she returned to play the recurring role of Trisha Taylor. She had earlier played the ongoing role of Cheryl Barker in serial Family Affairs for one year. Prior to that, she played Tilly Watkins (later Foss) in The House of Elliot.

It was announced on 23 September 2010 that Murphy was to return to EastEnders for the third time, this time playing Julie Perkins, who is an old friend of long-running character Billy Mitchell. It was revealed on 21 June 2011 that Murphy had quit the role after nearly a year.

Filmography

References

External links
 

1967 births
Living people
British film actresses
British television actresses
British soap opera actresses